The Pear Tree (Derakht-e-Golabi) is a 1998 Iranian drama film written and directed by Dariush Mehrjui with Homayoun Ershadi and Golshifteh Farahani in the lead. It was noted for the exemplary craftsmanship of Dariush Mehrjui on his examination of the Iranian bourgeoisie. This film also marked the debut of actress Golshifteh Farahani.

Synopsis
Mahmoud (Homayoun Ershadi) is suffering from writer's block and he is unable to continue the book he is currently working upon. He decides to take a break from his routine life and plans to visit his family's rural estate that is situated at north of Tehran. He also intends to complete his book in this visit. While at the estate, Mahmoud's attention is brought to the old Pear Tree that is situated behind the estate by the old gardener of the estate (Nematollah Gorji). Seeing the Pear Tree,  Mahmoud thinks about his past - his infatuation towards his  14-year-old female cousin known only as M (Golshifteh Farahani), his adolescent dreams, how that changed over the years. The rest of the film chronicles thoughts of Mahmoud and his past.

Cast
Homayoun Ershadi as Mahmoud
Golshifteh Farahani as M
Nematollah Gorji as Old gardener
Shaghayegh Farahani
Mohammad Reza Shaban-Noori
Sassan Bagherpour
Jafar Bozorgi
Amir Ali Ghezelayagh
Shahram Haghighat Doost
Ahou Alagha
Rahman Hoseini
Jahangir Mirshekari
Maryam Moghbeli
Maliheh Nazari

Reception
The Pear Tree was met with highly positive reviews and considered as a majestic inclination of internalization of Iranian Cinema.  This movie is usually considered as one of the finest example of Dariush Mehrjui's craftmanship. While some of the reviews compared it with Ingmar Bergman's The Wild Strawberries, some of them noted that some of the flashback scenes served as fragile symbols for the Mehrjui's hope for Iran's future. The performances of Homayoun Ershadi and Golshifteh Farahani were hailed, and so as the cinematography of Mahmoud Kalari.

Awards 
Silver Hugo Award for Best Feature Film in Chicago International Film Festival (1998)
Simorgh Prize for Best Actress for Golshifteh Farahani  in Fajr Film Festival (1998)
''Simorg Prize for Best Cinematography for Mahmoud Kalari in Fajr Film Festival (1998)

References

External links

 

1998 films
Iranian drama films
1998 drama films
Films directed by Dariush Mehrjui